Carol Gluck (born November 12, 1941) is an American academic and Japanologist.  She is the George Sansom Professor Emerita of History at Columbia University and served as the president of the Association for Asian Studies in 1996.

Career
Gluck was born in Chicago, Illinois, and received her B.A. from Wellesley in 1962.  She was awarded her Ph.D. from Columbia in 1977.

She has been a visiting professor at the University of Tokyo, the University of Venice, Harvard University, and the École des hautes études en sciences sociales in Paris.  Gluck directs the East Asian Studies program within the Weatherhead East Asian Institute. She was president of the Association for Asian Studies in 1996.

Select works

Books
 2019 – Senso no Kioku (War Memory) Tokyo: Kodansha.
 2007 – Rekishi de kangaeru (Thinking with History). Tokyo: Iwanami
 1985 (republished in 2021) – Japan's Modern Myths: Ideology in the Late Meiji Period. Princeton: Princeton University Press.

Edited books
 2009 – Words in Motion co-edited with Anna Tsing. Durham, North Carolina: Duke University Press.
 1997 – Asia in Western and World History: A Guide for Teaching co-edited with Ainslie Embree. Armonk, New York: M. E. Sharpe.
 1992 – Showa: the Japan of Hirohito co-edited with Stephen Graubard. New York: W. W. Norton & Company.

Articles
 "Meiji and Modernity: From History to Theory,” in Intrecci Culturali ed. Rosa Caroli (Venice, 2009)
 "Ten Top Things to Know About Japan in the Early Twentieth Century," Education About Asia (Winter 2008).

Affiliations
 American Academy of Arts and Sciences
 American Philosophical Society

Honors
 2006 – Order of the Rising Sun, Gold Rays with Neck Ribbon
 2002 – Japan-United States Fulbright Program 50th Anniversary Distinguished Scholar Award

Notes

References

 Gibney, Frank.  "Imperial Failings" (a review of The Age of Hirohito: in Search of Modern Japan by Daikichi Irokawa." New York Times. September 24, 1995
 Pogrebin, Robin.  "Japan Society Celebrates Its Centennial While Mending Its Fences," New York Times. March 22, 2007.
 Rich, Motoko, Lukas Schwarzacher and Fumie Tomita.  "Land Of the Rising Cliché," New York Times. January 4, 2004.

External links
 Weatherhead East Asian Institute

1941 births
Living people
People from Illinois
Wellesley College alumni
Columbia University alumni
Columbia University faculty
American Japanologists
Recipients of the Order of the Rising Sun, 3rd class
Presidents of the Association for Asian Studies